Longfellow Creek is a stream in the Delridge district of West Seattle, in Seattle, Washington. It runs about 3.38 miles (5.4 km) from Roxhill Park north to the Duwamish West Waterway at Elliott Bay. The Duwamish called the creek "Smelt" (Lushootseed: t7áWee), denoting smelt fish (Hypomesus pretiosus). The creek was a traditional fishery dating back to the 14th century.

Longfellow Creek is one of the four largest in urban Seattle, 2,685 acres (1,087 ha). It flows north from the Roxhill Park neighborhood for several miles along the valley of the Delridge neighborhoods of West Seattle, turning east to reach the Duwamish Waterway via a 3,300 ft (1006 m) pipe beneath the Nucor plant (formerly Bethlehem Steel).

Salmon, absent for 60 years, began returning without intervention as soon as toxic input was ended and barriers were removed. Construction of a fish ladder at the north end of the West Seattle Golf Course will allow spawning salmon up along the fairways. Farther upstream the city has been enlarging and building more storm-detention ponds, recreation areas, and an outdoor-education center at Camp Long.

The creek emerges at the 10,000-year-old Roxhill Bog, south of the Westwood Village shopping center. Three acres of open upland, wetland and wooded space just east of Chief Sealth High School in Westwood is the first daylight of Longfellow Creek.

It has seen some plant and tree restoration since 1997.  After more than a decade of preparation by hundreds of neighborhood volunteers, a restoration and 4.2-mile (6.7-km) trail was completed in 2004.  Invasive vegetation is decreasing as native species retake hold. Blue herons and coyotes can be seen.

See also 
 Daylighting (streams)
 Stream
 Water resources

Notes and references 

== Further reading ==
 "Longfellow Creek: Community Web Site"
 "The Creek"
 Longfellow Creek Watershed Action Project
 Friends of Creeks and Urban Salmon
 Longfellow Creek, City of Seattle Urban Creeks Legacy

Landforms of Seattle
Rivers of Washington (state)
Subterranean rivers of the United States
Rivers of King County, Washington
West Seattle, Seattle